Gəndov (also, Gəndav, Ashagyy-Gendob, Bash-Gendob, and Yukhary Gyandov) is a village and municipality in the Davachi Rayon of Azerbaijan.  It has a population of 2,296.

References 

Populated places in Shabran District